The Combined Arms Academy of the Armed Forces of the Russian Federation is a military academy in Moscow which provides graduate education for officers of the Russian Armed Forces. The full name reads: The Combined Academies Order of Lenin Order of the October Revolution Red Bannered Order of Suvorov of the Armed Forces of the Russian Federation-Military Educational and Scientific Center of the Russian Ground Forces. 

There are 30 departments within the academy. They are housed in two main buildings in the Khamovniki and Lefortovo Districts of Moscow. It has a source of historical origin and functionally duplicates the General Staff Academy. It is the equivalent of the United States Army's Command and General Staff College at Fort Leavenworth or the British Army's Staff College in Camberley. Since 2019, the current Commandant of the Combined Military Academy is Lieutenant General Aleksander Romanchuk.

History

The predecessors of the Academy were the Frunze Military Academy and the Malinovsky Military Armored Forces Academy and the Shaposhnikov Higher Officer Courses “Shot”. The CAA was formed in 1998 on the base of both the Frunze Military Academy and the Armored Forces Academy. Since 2006 the Military Institute of the Engineering Troops was included as a structural unit in the reorganization of the V. V. Kuybyshev Military Engineering Academy. 

In December 2008, its name was expanded to reflect its status as an institution. The reorganization was carried out by joining the academy with state educational institutions of higher professional education:

Far Eastern Higher Combined Arms Command School
Kazan Higher Military Command School
Moscow Higher Military Command School
Novosibirsk Higher Military Command School
Yekaterinburg Higher Artillery Command School
Ryazan Higher Airborne Command School
Omsk Tank Engineering Institute
Chelyabinsk Higher Military Automobile Command Engineering School
Penza Artillery Engineering Institute
Tula Artillery Engineering Institute
Military Institute for Advanced Studies of Specialists of Mobilization Bodies of the Armed Forces (Saratov)

In June 2007, in accordance with the a decree of the President Vladimir Putin, a combat banner was awarded. The Academy is subordinate to the Commander-in-Chief of the Russian Ground Forces.

Activities
The Combined Arms Academy carries out the following activities: training for commanding officers and military engineers with higher professional education and conducting fundamental and applied scientific research aimed at solving the problems of strengthening the country's defense capability and improving the professional education of military personnel. 

Organizationally, the academy consists of a command with a management apparatus, a military institute for the engineering troops, 1 branch, faculties, departments, research groups and laboratories, academic courses, doctoral studies, postgraduate studies, units and educational process support services.

Foreign cadets
Officers and cadets of foreign armies are trained at special faculties.

Band
Band of the Combined Arms Academy was formed in 1998 from Frunze Military Academy Band and the Malinovsky Military Armored Forces Academy Band. This gives the band an over 85-year history. By order of the Chairman of the Revolutionary Military Council in December 1931, a military band at the Frunze Military Academy was created. The first artistic director of the band was Colonel V. Gurfinkel. During the Great Patriotic War, many musicians of the band as part of the front-line brigades went to the front with concerts for fighters and commanders of the Red Army.

It has performed at the largest concert venues in Moscow: including the Kremlin Palace of Congresses, the House of the Unions, and the Tchaikovsky Concert Hall. On the All-Union Radio, the academy band recorded seven discs and over one hundred and twenty works of Soviet and foreign composers. In 1972, the team traveled to Belgium to participate in the celebration of the Independence Day and in 1990 gave a concert on the Champs Elysees in Paris.

Decorations
 Order of Lenin 
 Order of the October Revolution
 Order of Red Banner
 Order of Suvorov

Heads

Colonel General Leonid Zolotov (August 1998 - September 2002)
Colonel General Vladimir Popov (September 2002 - December 2009)
Major General Alexei Kim (December 2009 - January 2010)
Lieutenant General Viktor Polyakov (January 2010 - July 2014)
Lieutenant General Oleg Makarevich (July 2014 - September 2017)
Lieutenant General Aleksandr Lapin (September - November 2017)
Lieutenant General Sergey Yudin (November 2017 - April 2018) (Interim)
Lieutenant General Alexey Avdeev (April 2018 - 2019)
Lieutenant General Aleksander Romanchuk (Since 2019)

Alumni
Sulim Yamadayev
Oleg Kozlov

See also
Soviet military academies
Combined Arms Training Centre (Australia)
United States Army Combined Arms Center

References

External links
https://web.archive.org/web/20070526054824/http://www.mil.ru/848/1045/1272/21010/21014/22541/index.shtml

Educational institutions established in 1998
Military academies of Russia
Universities in Moscow
1998 establishments in Russia
Military units and formations awarded the Order of the Red Banner